The Dancers may refer to:

 The Dancers (play), a 1923 play by Gerald du Maurier and Viola Tree, written under the pen name Hubert Parsons
 The Dancers (1925 film), an American silent adaptation of the play, directed by Emmett J. Flynn
 The Dancers (1930 film), an American adaptation of the play, directed by Chandler Sprague

See also
 Dancer (disambiguation)
 The Dancer (disambiguation)